The First Stafford Ministry was the third responsible government to be formed in New Zealand, and the first to last more than a few weeks. It formed in June 1856, and lasted until July 1861. As the office of Premier had yet to be established, Edward Stafford served as head of the government, although initially Henry Sewell was the Minister who reported to the Governor.

Background
Stafford defeated William Fox 18–17 in a confidence motion based on the latter's proposal to give the provinces the bulk of state funding. He thereafter resigned the Superintendency of Nelson Province and formed a ministry including Henry Sewell, who was soon sent to London to negotiate a loan, and the detail-oriented William Richmond. Sewell became alienated from the ministry during his long absence and resigned a couple of months after returning in 1859. Meanwhile, Stafford followed a centralist policy: the government allocated a portion of land sale revenue to the provinces, ensuring that once the bulk of Crown land was sold, the provincial governments would struggle to raise enough revenue to survive; they also passed the New Provinces Act, permitting the break-up of the existing units into smaller and less powerful provinces.

The other main feature of the first Stafford Government was Māori policy, which was reserved to the Governor with the Ministry only being permitted to offer advice. In light of the rise of the Kingitanga, the Ministry favoured Francis Dart Fenton's scheme to create self-governing constitutional institutions for Maori, but was countermanded by Governor Thomas Gore Browne and his advisor, Donald McLean. In 1860 the First Taranaki War broke out over land sales conducted by the Governor's officials, leading to criticism of the Ministry's role. At the start of the 1861 session, Fox moved a confidence motion in the midst of the ramp-up of tensions in the Waikato, and won by two votes.

Ministers
The following members served in the Stafford Ministry:

See also
 New Zealand Government

Notes

References

Ministries of Queen Victoria
Governments of New Zealand
19th century in New Zealand
1856 establishments in New Zealand
Cabinets established in 1856
Cabinets disestablished in 1861